KOAD-LP was a classic rock formatted broadcast radio station.  The station was licensed to Hanford, California and serving Hanford, Lemoore, and Kings County in California.  KOAD-LP was owned by Denise M. White and operated under the Hanford Youth Services, Inc.

History
Denise M. White and Hanford Youth Services, Inc. applied for the construction permit to begin the process of building what would become KOAD on November 12, 2013.  The station received a License to Cover, allowing it to begin broadcasting, from the Federal Communications Commission (FCC) on November 13, 2014.

KOAD-LP signed-on for the first time on February 9, 2015 with a classic rock format.  This would bring English-language radio back to Kings County after 20 years.  After signing on, local entertainment promotion personality Joey Perez was hired by KOAD-LP for their morning show.  By 2016, plans were in place to regionally syndicate the morning show.  Other programming included a live, weekly sports show from a Buffalo Wild Wings location in Hanford.

The station made regional headlines in 2018 when a photo, taken by morning show host Joey Perez, of Tom Cruise shooting scenes for Top Gun: Maverick at nearby Naval Air Station Lemoore.  Hanford Youth Services received the donation of KNBI in Monterey, California, and per FCC rules, had to request the cancellation of KOAD-LP's license on December 3, 2020. KOAD-LP ceased broadcast operations, but continued to operate over internet radio until April 2022, when the stream was flipped to KMBY Monterey.

Translator
In addition to KOAD-LP's primary frequency, the station's programming was simulcast on the following translator station to widen KOAD-LP's broadcast area.

References

External links
 K-Fun 92-5 Online

Hanford, California
2015 establishments in California
Radio stations established in 2015
OAD-LP
OAD-LP
Classic rock radio stations in the United States
2020 disestablishments in California
Radio stations disestablished in 2020
OAD-LP
Defunct radio stations in the United States